Colorado's 8th Senate district is one of 35 districts in the Colorado Senate. It has been represented by Democrat Dylan Roberts since 2023. Prior to redistricting the district was represented by Republicans Bob Rankin and Randy Baumgardner.

Geography
District 8 is based in the mountain and plains towns of the upper Western Slope, covering all of Garfield, Grand, Jackson, Moffatt, Rio Blanco, Routt, and Summit Counties. Communities in the district include Glenwood Springs, Rifle, Carbondale, New Castle, Silt, Parachute, Battlement Mesa, No Name, Meeker, Rangely, Craig, Steamboat Springs, Hayden, Walden, Fraser, Granby, Kremmling, Breckenridge, Frisco, Silverthorne, and Keystone.

The district overlaps with Colorado's 2nd and 3rd congressional districts, and with the 13th, 26th, 57th, and 61st districts of the Colorado House of Representatives.

Recent election results
Colorado state senators are elected to staggered four-year terms. The old 8th district held elections in presidential years, but the new district drawn following the 2020 Census will hold elections in midterm years.

2022
The 2022 election will be the first one held under the state's new district lines. Incumbent Republican Senator Bob Rankin was redistricted to the 5th district, and State Rep. Dylan Roberts is running to succeed him in the 8th district, which was redrawn to be more friendly to Democrats.

Historical election results

2020
In 2017 and 2018, a sexual harassment claim was made against Senator Randy Baumgardner, which he denied. Baumgardner survived an expulsion vote in April 2018, but ultimately resigned in January 2019 after further allegations came to light. Then-State Rep. Bob Rankin was chosen by a Republican vacancy committee to replace him, beating out former State Rep. Gregg Rippy and several other candidates. Rankin won his first full term in 2020.

2016

2012

Federal and statewide results in District 8

References 

8
Garfield County, Colorado
Grand County, Colorado
Jackson County, Colorado
Moffat County, Colorado
Rio Blanco County, Colorado
Routt County, Colorado
Summit County, Colorado